The Communist Committee of Cabinda (CCC) was a militant separatist group fighting for the independence of Cabinda from Angola. The CCC was led by Kaya Mohamed Yay and Geraldo Pedro. It split off from the Front for the Liberation of the Enclave of Cabinda (FLEC) in 1988.

See also
 Angolan Civil War

References

African and Black nationalist organizations in Africa
Defunct political parties in Angola
Cold War in Africa
Communist parties in Angola
Secessionist organizations
Rebel groups in Angola
Political parties established in 1988
1988 establishments in Angola
Political parties with year of disestablishment missing
National liberation movements in Africa